The Assembly of the People's Representatives (ARP) is Tunisia's legislative branch of government. The unicameral Assembly replaced the Constituent Assembly and was first elected on 26 October 2014. The legislature consists of 217 seats. Before the 2011 revolution, Tunisia's parliament was bicameral and consisted of an upper chamber called the Chamber of Advisors and a lower chamber called the Chamber of Deputies.

Tunisia's electoral law requires "vertical gender parity", i.e. male and female candidates must alternate within each party's regional list of candidates. Consequently, as of 2015, 68 of the chamber's members are women, the highest proportion of female legislative representatives in the Arab world.

Elections

The first elections to the Assembly were held on 26 October 2014, slightly under four years since the conclusion of the Tunisian Revolution, and slightly under three years since the election to the Constituent Assembly. Nidaa Tounes gained a plurality of votes, winning 85 seats in the 217-seat parliament, beating the Ennahda Movement (69 seats) and many smaller parties.

2019 Election

The second election to the Assembly was held on 6 October 2019. During the election, civil society groups were concerned about the spread of hate speech and disinformation on social media. In 2019 Facebook implemented policy measures that address political and election-related conversations on the site in India, Australia, the US, the UK, the EU, Brazil, and Canada. These policies allow for data on ad campaigns to be released for study to help improve future democratic elections. Such policies had not yet been implemented in the Middle East or North Africa. During the election, Facebook was one of the main platforms for campaigning. The camping data was primarily inaccessible to any observation agency. This lack of information raised concerns for civil society groups that wished to study the data and monitor the spread of disinformation during the election.

Suspension of Parliament on 25 July 2021
On 25 July 2021, in light of violent demonstrations against the government demanding the improvement of basic services and amid a growing COVID-19 outbreak, Saied suspended parliament for thirty days and waiving the immunity of the parliament members and ordering the military to close the parliament house. 

On 24 August 2021, Saied extended the suspension of parliament, although the constitution states the parliament can only be suspended for a month, raising concerns in some quarters about the future of democracy in the country. There is currently no   in Tunisia to offer jurisdiction in his interpretation of the constitution.

On 22 September, Saied announced that he will rule by decree and ignore parts of the constitution.

On 13 December 2021, Saied extended the suspension of the parliament until a new election takes place, and announced a nationwide public consultation that  would take place from 1 January  until 20 March 2022 to gather suggestions for constitutional and other reforms after which Saied would appoint a committee of experts to draft a new constitution, to be ready by June ahead of the referendum that will take place on 25 July 2022. He said that new parliamentary  elections will be held on 17 December 2022, after going through the referendum and preparing a new electoral system.

Dissolution on 30 March 2022
On 30 March 2022 president Saied ordered the formal dissolution of the Assembly, in order to "preserve the state and its institutions". Some hours before, parliamentarians held a plenary session online and voted through a bill against Saied's "exceptional measures".

Re-convention in March 2023
A year after president Saied formally dissolved the Assembly, the new parliament sat for the first time in March 2023. This was the first time parliament sat since the previous parliament was sealed by the army in 2011 and since the elections in December 2022 and January 2023. 

Unfortunately, both elections were boycotted by large parts of the population, with only 11% of the eligible voters voting in the elections. The session was heavily restricted with only journalists from the state broadcaster and official state news agency allowed inside the building to report on the events of the first session, while dozens of reporters protested outside.

Current affiliations

See also
Politics of Tunisia
List of legislatures by country
Tunisian parliamentary election, 2014

References

2014 establishments in Tunisia
Government of Tunisia
Unicameral legislatures
Tunisia